Nanbin Park, also known as Chongqing Riverside Park, is a major belt-shaped urban park in Nan'an District of Chongqing. The park is made up by six continuous parks distributed along the Nanbin Road and Yangtze River. Each of six parks represents a notable landscape or urban legend. The six parks, listed from west to east, are:

 Huangge Wan Du
 Haitang Yanyu
 Zishui Xiaodeng
 Xiajiang Kaibu()
 Longmen Haoyue
 Yuwang Yizong

Each of these six parks is one of either old or new Twelve Views of Chongqing, which has become attractions for years. The Nanbin Park was created in 2005 to merge them into one single tourist attraction.

Nan'an District
Parks in Chongqing